"Car Horn" is a non-album single by rapper Common and producer Mark the 45 King. Released in 1999 by Groove Attack Productions, the song features free-associative battle raps. It was remixed by Madlib for Common's white label release Common Remixes.

See also
List of Common songs

1999 singles
Common (rapper) songs
1999 songs
Songs written by Common (rapper)